The 2013 BBC Sports Personality of the Year Award was presented on 15 December from the First Direct Arena in Leeds. It was the 60th presentation of the BBC Sports Personality of the Year Award. Awarded annually by the British Broadcasting Corporation (BBC), the main titular award honours an individual's British sporting achievement over the past year, with the winner selected by public vote from a ten-person shortlist.

The event was presented by Gary Lineker, Clare Balding and Gabby Logan with musical performances from John Newman and Russell Watson. Sue Barker decided to step down as a presenter after 19 years.

The winner of the main award was tennis player Andy Murray.
Former Manchester United manager, Sir Alex Ferguson won the special BBC Sports Personality Diamond Award.

Basis of nominations
Prior to 2012, a panel of thirty sports journalists each submit a list of ten contenders. From these contenders a shortlist of ten nominees is determined—currently, in the event of a tie at the end of the nomination process, a panel of six former award winners determined the nominee by a Borda count. The shortlist was announced at the beginning of December, and the winner was determined on the night of the ceremony by a public telephone vote.

In 2011 the shortlist produced only contained male competitors, which caused media uproar.  The selection process for contenders was changed for the 2012 (and future) awards as follows:

The BBC introduced an expert panel who were asked to devise a shortlist that reflected UK sporting achievements on the national and/or international stage, represented the breadth and depth of UK sports and took into account "impact" within and beyond the sport or sporting achievement in question.

Nominees
The nominees for the 2013 award and their share of the votes cast were as follows:

Other awards
In addition to the main award as "Sports Personality of the Year", several other awards were also announced:

Overseas Personality: Sebastian Vettel
Team of the Year: 2013 British & Irish Lions squad
BBC Diamond Award: Sir Alex Ferguson
Coach of the Year: Warren Gatland
Helen Rollason Award: Anne Williams
Young Personality: Amber Hill
Unsung Hero Award: Joe and Maggie Forber

In Memoriam

Acer Nethercott
Christian Benitez
Jean Pickering
Bert Trautmann
Todd Bennett
Andrew Simpson
Tony Gubba
Graham Murray
Reg Simpson
Tony Greig
Bill Foulkes
Emmanuel McDonald Bailey
Jo Pitt
Bill Hoskyns
Ron Davies
Martin Richard Krystle Campbell Lu Lingzi
Maria De Villota
Dave Hickson
Ken Norton
Cliff Morgan
Mike Denness
Helen Elliot
Dean Powell
David Oates
Sean Edwards
Henry Cecil
Tommy Morrison
Brian Greenhoff
Donna Hartley-Wass
Christopher Martin-Jenkins
Dave Thomas
Phill Nixon
Steve Prescott

References

External links
Official website

BBC Sports Personality of the Year awards
2013 in British television
2013 in British sport
Bbc
Bbc
BBC Sports Personality of the Year